George Cope (c. 1534 – 23 June 1572), of Canons Ashby and Eydon, Northamptonshire, was an English politician.

He was a Member (MP) of the Parliament of England for Ludgershall in 1563.

References

1534 births
1572 deaths
People from West Northamptonshire District
English MPs 1563–1567